Strumigenys emmae is a species of ant in the genus Strumigenys. It is 1.5 millimeters long and is yellowish brown, has a 4 segmented antennae, small eyes, and has hairs on the head, mesosoma, and petiole that are mostly scale-like or orbicular. They are difficult to find other than when encountered in leaf litter samples or pitfall traps. They are normally slow moving, but they can move fast when disturbed. The species first strike usually kills its prey. The species colony is small. It is most often found in beach margins and agricultural areas.

References

External links

Landcare Research

Myrmicinae
Insects described in 1890